Mary Eddy may refer to:

 Mary Baker Eddy (1821–1910), founder of Christian Science
 Mary Pierson Eddy (1864–1923), religious and medical missionary